Eurasian Singaporeans are Singaporeans of mixed European and Asian descent. Their Asian ancestry trace from Colonial India to other colonies while their European ancestry trace back to western Europe primarily, although Eurasian settlers to Singapore in the 19th century came largely from other European colonies. These included British Malaya and British Sarawak, part of the former British Raj India, of the former Portuguese India and Chittagong (today in Bangladesh), the Dutch East Indies and French Indochina. When the European maritime powers colonised Asian countries, such as Colonial India, Ceylon, Malaya, Singapore, Indonesia and Indochina, from the 16th to 20th centuries, they brought into being a new group of commingled ethnicities known historically as Eurasians.

Early Europeans were primarily male and often had children with local women. Initially, the offspring of such a union were brought up as an appendage of European culture, enjoying further advantages not generally accorded to the rest of the local Asian people.

European ancestry

Romans and Italians
The first documented Europeans to visit Southeast Asia were the Romans and Italians. In 166 AD, a Roman mission travelled to China via modern day Vietnam, bringing presents of elephant tusk, rhinoceros horn, and tortoise shell from Southern Asia. Archaeological evidence supports the claim in the Weilüe and Book of Liang that Roman merchants were active in northern Vietnam. Between 1275 and 1292, Marco Polo spent 17 years as an emissary of Kublai Khan, visiting tributary kingdoms in modern day Indonesia, Myanmar, Sri Lanka and Vietnam. In the 1320s, Odoric of Pordenone visited Borneo, Champa, and Java. In the 1420s, the Venetian merchant and explorer Niccolo de' Conti married an Indian woman, and travelled extensively in modern day Indonesia, Malaysia, and Vietnam.

Of Portuguese descent
Before the arrival of the Dutch, English and French in Asia, the first Europeans to land and seize territory in Asia were the Portuguese. Portuguese spice-traders first sailed to Malacca in 1509, having already established settlements in Goa and other parts of India.  Portuguese explorers and conquerors were accompanied by the first Jesuit priests to Southeast Asia via Goa in Portuguese India. Afonso de Albuquerque, the viceroy of India, conquered Malacca (today just a few hours' drive from Singapore) in 1511, while Jesuit Francis Xavier, (a Basque Spaniard serving the Portuguese Crown) arrived in Malacca in 1545. Descendants of Portuguese colonialists who lived in Malacca and are of mixed Portuguese, Dutch, British and Asian descent, are collectively known as the Gente Kristang. This group is characterised by being Catholic, supporting Portuguese surnames and having its own distinctive Portuguese creole, the Kristang language, although it is now only spoken by a few, older members of the community. Many are descended from individuals who lived in Malacca or other parts of Malaya. Others have ancestors who lived in Java or other parts of Indonesia as a result of being expelled from Malacca after the Portuguese were forcibly ejected from Malacca by the Johore-Dutch alliance in 1641. A few Macanese people of Cantonese-Portuguese ancestry from Macau are also living in Singapore.

Kristang
Eurasians or Kristang Eurasians who generally have some Kristang-speaking ancestry form a sub-group distinct from those who are the offspring of more recent immigrants and expatriates of European and Asian origin and who are also commonly called "Eurasians" in Singapore.  The same or similar distinction exists between on the one hand those first- or second-generation Eurasians who typically would share the ethnic identity of one parent more closely, that parent typically not being of Kristang or Portuguese-origin and on the other hand multi-generation(i.e. typically third-generation, fourth-generation and fifth-generation, etc) Eurasians who typically might have at least some distant Kristang-speaking or Iberian-origin ancestry, and many of whom would associate with some Kristang or Portuguese-origin cultural practices (e.g. Kristang songs and Portuguese-origin dances like Jinkli Nona) and dine on Kristang Eurasian dishes like Devil's curry or curry debal in Kristang. As a general rule, first or second-generation Eurasians typically do not have any Kristang-speaking ancestry, do not speak Kristang, generally do not adopt Kristang or Portuguese-origin cultural practices and cues and are less familiar with Kristang Eurasian cuisine, language and history. Simply put, first-generation Eurasians are people whose parents are not Eurasians. Multi-generation (typically third-generation, fourth-generation and fifth-generation, etc) Eurasians are people whose parents or forefathers are themselves Eurasians.

Of Dutch descent
In 1602, a Dutch trading company called the Vereenigde Oostindische Compagnie or VOC (literally "United East Indies Company" but better known in English as the Dutch East India Company) was created to conduct trade in the area east of the Cape of Good Hope and west of the Straits of Magellan. In establishing their numerous trade stations spanning across Asia, the Dutch created independent settler societies in each of their colonies, where Batavia (now Jakarta, Indonesia) became the administrative centre and rendezvous point for the company's Asian shipping traffic.

Between 1602 and 1795, the VOC fitted out some 4,700 ships which carried more than a million Europeans to Singapore. More than 70 percent of the one million of the passengers never actually returned to Europe, making Asia their new home.  These early seafarers were not only made up of Dutch, but also included English, Germans, French Huguenots, Italians, Scandinavians and other Europeans who were employed by the VOC. In time, many were assimilated into Dutch colonies situated throughout Asia (though primarily in modern Indonesia) where they were stationed and became part of the respective communities.

Intermarriages between VOC employees and locals were encouraged, which led to the creation of communities of Dutch descendants.  Today, there are only five surviving coherent and large communities who are descended from those early intermarriages. They are the Cape Coloureds (South Africa), Basters and Oorlam (Namibia), Burghers (Sri Lanka), and Indos (Indonesia). Other Dutch groups have persisted as a strain among the Anglo-Burmese and Kristang. The Dutch transferred Malacca to the British in 1825 in exchange for territory in Sumatra. The British colonial administration encouraged migration away from Malacca and as a result many Eurasians and other people moved north to thriving Penang (where other Eurasians fleeing Phuket or moving from Kedah also settled) and later south to Singapore as it grew in the late 19th and early 20th centuries.  Dutch descendants in Malaysia and Singapore are primarily made up of Eurasians originating from Malacca, as well as others who emigrated from the East Indies, India and Sri Lanka.  Leo and Hilda Campbell were Dutch Burghers who arrived in Singapore from Sri Lanka (then Ceylon) in 1910.  The couple planned to migrate to Australia like many Eurasians but due to Hilda suffering a stroke, they remained in Singapore.

Of British and Irish descent

The British were the most important Europeans in colonial Singapore, as they were the colonial rulers of the island. A number of British settlers arrived after its colonial status changed in 1867.  Interracial marriage was very common in colonial days.  Even men who had European wives sometimes had local paramours. European women who moved to Southeast Asia tended to die young.  British men took Asian partners and their offspring would be Eurasian. Some who had British nationality preferred to settle in Britain or other parts of the Commonwealth, especially Australia.  Many British and other European men of retirement age, instead of going back to cold Europe, would settle in Australia with Asian women, with fewer staying on in Singapore.  Apart from being warmer than Europe, Australia was less judgemental than Europe or colonial Singapore to mixed marriages and mixed offspring. Independent Singapore's second President, Benjamin Sheares, was a Eurasian of English lineage. E. W. Barker, the former Law Minister, was of mixed- Portuguese, Irish, Japanese, Scottish, Malay and German descent. Author Rex Shelley was of mixed English, Portuguese, Malay and Buginese ancestry. National swimmer Joseph Schooling is a third-generation Singaporean, and is of Eurasian ethnicity.  His parents are Colin and May Schooling. May is a Chinese Malaysian and a Singapore permanent resident; while Colin, a businessman, was born in Singapore. Colin's grandfather was a British military officer who married a local Portuguese-Eurasian in Singapore. The last name Schooling is believed to be an anglicised surname that originated in Germany.

Of other European descent
Other Eurasians in Singapore have parents or are descended from individuals who originated from various parts of Western Europe and its former colonies such as in the Americas, Australia, New Zealand, South Africa or elsewhere.  There are also some Filipino people of partial Spanish descent. Former Nominated Member of Parliament Eunice Olsen's father is of Swedish and Portuguese descent. His grandfather married a Chinese woman in Shanghai and brought her to Singapore. Geraldene Lowe's mother’s family was called Luth and came from Schleswig-Holstein, then part of Denmark. During Bismarck’s unification of Germany, they headed to Asia and Australia and married people from various nationalities.

Asian ancestry

Of Chinese descent
Olympic gold medallist swimmer Joseph Schooling is a Eurasian, as is his father Colin Schooling. His mother May Schooling is a Chinese-Malaysian while his father is of British, Swedish, Kristang and Portuguese descent.

Of Malay and Indonesian descent
Author Rex Shelley was of mixed English, Portuguese, Malay and Buginese ancestry.

Of Indian descent
Singer, Tabitha Nauser is a Eurasian of paternal Swiss and maternal Indian-Singaporean descent.

Of Japanese and Korean descent

Other Eurasians in Singapore have parents or are descended from individuals who originated from Japan, Korea or other parts of East Asia. An example is TV personality and presenter Stephanie Carrington, who is half White American and half Korean.

Double-barrelled race classification in official documents

Since January 2010, the Government in Singapore has allowed the double-barrelling of race classification by parents of different races when they register their children. A child may be registered, for instance, as Malay-Caucasian or Caucasian-Chinese. Before 2010, the government required children to register as a single race, which was required to be the father's. The added flexibility is in response to increasing demographic diversity driven by immigration and more multi-cultural marriages.

Culture and traditions

Languages and Kristang patois

English is generally spoken as a first language by almost all Eurasians in Singapore. A number of Eurasians speak Asian languages like Malay, Chinese (Mandarin or other Sinitic Languages) or Tamil as a second or third language.  Like many Singaporeans, Eurasians will commonly speak Singlish. Some of the elder generation of Kristang Eurasians, typically those who have a Portuguese surname or are of Kristang-speaking descent, speak the Portuguese Creole known as Cristão or Papia Kristang (Speaking Kristang) – the Kristang language at home and within their small community.  Kristang is a dying patois and is only spoken by a small minority of Eurasians.

Religion and education
The Eurasian community in Singapore includes people that belong to different religions and to no religion, but most of them are Christians, mostly Catholic, with religious celebrations like Christmas typically being an integral part of their lifestyle.  Many Eurasians in Singapore have been educated in Catholic mission schools like St Joseph's Institution. Protestant Eurasians in Singapore include Anglicans (Episcopals), Presbyterians, Methodists, Lutherans and Evangelicals. Eurasians looked upon an English education as a passport to a better life in colonial Singapore and so their children were among the first to enrol in the earliest English language schools when they were set up. They attained the highest literacy rate among the local groups here. This enabled them to secure comfortable employment, in both public and private sectors, following in the footsteps of their fathers and as a family tradition for the future generations.

Eurasian cuisine
Eurasian culinary traditions include Eurasian smore (a beef stew), mulligatawny soup (mulligatani in Kristang), shepherd's pie and vindaloo (vin d'arlo in Kristang).  Desserts include putugal and sugee cake made with semolina, a dessert that is also associated with the Eurasians, but also with the Peranakan Chinese.

Prominence in the media, entertainment and fashion industries
Eurasians are prominent in the media, entertainment and fashion industry and are sought after because of their mixed look. In Singapore, Eurasian models are sometimes called 'Pan-Asians' for their mixed appearance. Apart from displaying certain Singaporean beauty standards, a common belief among those in the advertising industries of both Singapore and Malaysia is that a Eurasian model can appeal to different ethnic groups of Asian origin and thus there would be no need to create different advertisements to target different groups. For example, an advertisement featuring a Malaysian-Eurasian face could be used in places like Sri Lanka, Nepal, Thailand or Singapore because non-Eurasian Malaysians with their diverse origins could pass off as a Sri Lankan, Nepalese, Thai or Singaporean.

In media and entertainment, father and son Brian and Mark Richmond, Vernetta Lopez and Jean Danker are well-known radio personalities.

Eurasians in Singapore have also made their mark in the artistic and cultural domains. Jeremy Monteiro is a renowned jazz musician and Cultural Medallion winner. Rex Shelly was an award-winning writer known for his novels that feature the Eurasian community in Singapore and Malaysia.

'Eurasiana - A Musical Tribute'
In June 2009, 'Eurasiana - A Musical Tribute' marking the 90th anniversary of the Eurasian Association was performed at the Esplanade Concert Hall.  It was a showcase of Eurasian music, dance and culture in Singapore. Also performing was the 50-piece Singapore Pop Orchestra led by Maestro Iskandar Ismail.

Places associated with Eurasians
Soon after the founding of Singapore by Stamford Raffles in 1819, people from other trading centres in Asia including Eurasians came to Singapore.  Wealthy Eurasians set up home along Waterloo Street and Queen Street in the area between Bras Basah Road and Middle Road, not far from today's Singapore Management University. The types of houses that they lived in included shophouses, two-storey houses, terrace houses and bungalows. These were typically owned by well-to-do merchants and traders. The houses on Queen Street also consisted of shophouses that were occupied by non-Eurasian coolies. The living conditions in these shophouses were poor but at least the coolies could live close to where they worked. These houses on Queen Street were owned by the more well-to-do Eurasians.  Nearby were Catholic schools like St Joseph's Institution and the Convent of the Holy Infant Jesus as well as other well-known schools that used to be located in the vicinity.  A number of buildings and churches of the period in the vicinity still stand today.  Today, few Eurasians can be found residing in the Waterloo Street and Queen Street area.

Eurasian families moved out from the enclaves to other locations such as the government quarters in Bukit Timah, the countryside areas in Serangoon and Upper Serangoon, and the then coastal region of Tanjong Katong. There were even kampongs (Malay for “villages”) along Haig Road and Siglap Road that had a concentration of Eurasian families. Another Eurasian enclave known as Little England was located in the area bounded by Farrer Park, Norfolk Road and Rangoon Road. The roads in the area were all named after English counties and towns.  Eurasians today can now be found spread thinly across the island in both private and public housing. In past times, many Eurasians lived in the Katong area, as did prominent tour guide Geraldene Lowe in her youth. Katong is commonly considered Singapore's main Eurasian enclave because of some history, modern Eurasian literature and the present location of the Eurasian Association, it is more of a Peranakan Chinese enclave.

The leading association for Eurasians in Singapore is the Eurasian Association at 139 Ceylon Road in Katong.  The Eurasian Association has played a major role in uniting the community and developing a stronger shared identity.  It also a self-help group which serves the Eurasian community in Singapore. It has expanded the definition of Eurasian to include any person of mixed European and Asian parentage. Previously, only persons whose fathers were of European origin or who had European surnames were considered Eurasian. As of the end of 2013, there were 2,128 members of the Eurasian Association of Singapore.

The Singapore Recreation Club facing the Padang, Singapore near City Hall, founded by several Eurasian men, is considered to a social and sports club that is popular amongst the Eurasians in Singapore.  E.W. Barker played sports like cricket and hockey for the Singapore Recreation Club (SRC) between 1934 and 1941, when the SRC was almost the strongest team in Singapore.

Eurasians during the Japanese Occupation
During the Japanese Occupation, Europeans and Eurasian Singaporeans were generally spared the harsher treatments by the Japanese than other racial groups; however many of them became an increasing nuisance for their activist efforts, in particular the Catholic societies, who fostered strong community bonds with the local Chinese. From December 1943 to April 1944, a combination of a collapsing currency, rising food and continued social activism culminated in the reactionary and punitive land acquisition strategy which relocated about 400 Roman Catholic Chinese and 300 European/Eurasian families (of which most were land-owners and many Chinese households also ran small businesses or shop-keeps from their homes) that forcibly acquired land and fixed property from homeowners in exchange for an equal area of dry land two miles from the town of Bahau in Negeri Sembilan state in Malaya. Propagandised in the ironic manner of sending them off to live happier, better lives as a purely Catholic community where they could run their own affairs despite the reality that it was meant as a punishment. The responsibility for administering the affairs of the settlement was mockingly bestowed to prominent activist for Chinese welfare under occupation Roman Catholic Bishop, Monseigneur Adrian Devals. On his own accord, Dr C. J. P. Paglar, President of the Eurasian Welfare Association visited the settlement frequently to bring much needed medical and other supplies as well as give the populace moral strength. Although many of the settlers were educated through missionary schools, and many of the landowners had practised limited subsistence farming on their properties in Singapore, the soil at the Bahau settlement was intentionally apportioned by the Japanese as it consisted of non-arable land where there was insufficient water for irrigation. While the Japanese kept to their policy of restraint against the Europeans and Catholics (mindful of their German and Italian allies), the measure was deliberately intended to result in hardship for the settlers. The entire process which resulted in the deaths of about 500 settlers was extensively concealed under propaganda which sought to portray the departure of Catholic families from Singapore as a willing venture. As many who were relocated were generally of higher social and economic status, the propaganda which depicted better lives, created a resentment in the local populace and misplaced sense of betrayal against those that had initially defended them against the Japanese. The perverse nature of the Japanese propaganda was highly effective and would have lasting ramifications of distrust between the local races and their former colonial protectors. Many suffered from malnutrition, as their subsistence farming attempts could not provide self-sufficiency. In addition, they were plagued by malaria and other diseases. An estimated 500 settlers lost their lives, including Bishop Devals who helped many others to survive the ordeal. After the Japanese surrendered to the British in August 1945, the survivors were allowed to return to Singapore however were not compensated for their land or property.

Notable Eurasian Singaporeans

 Edmund W. Barker, former People's Action Party cabinet minister, Parliament of Singapore
 Leslie Charteris, creator and author of novels and teleplays based on Simon Templar, aka The Saint 
 Jean Danker, radio presenter
 Andrea De Cruz, actress
 Barry Desker, Dean of the S Rajaratnam School of International Studies and former Ambassador to Indonesia
 Anna Belle Francis, model and actress
 Jessica Gomes, model of paternal Portuguese and maternal Chinese descent
 Ian Goodenough, Singaporean-born Australian politician of English, Portuguese, and Chinese Malaysian descent
 Hanli Hoefer, VJ and MTV Asia host of paternal German and maternal Peranakan descent
 Kenneth Jeyaretnam, Secretary-General of the Reform Party (Singapore)
 Philip Jeyaretnam, lawyer and novelist
 Denise Keller, model and MTV Asia host
 John Klass, radio DJ, musician
 Vernetta Lopez, TV actress and radio DJ
 Jeremy Monteiro, jazz musician
 Tabitha Nauser, singer, TV presenter and radio DJ
 Hensley Anthony Neville, convicted murderer
 Eunice Olsen, former television game show host and former Nominated Member of Parliament, Parliament of Singapore
 Michael Palmer, lawyer and former Speaker of the Parliament of Singapore
 Bernard Rodrigues (1933-2015), politician - founding member of the People's Action Party and leader of the NTUC (National Trades Union Congress)
 Joseph Schooling, Olympic gold medal-winning swimmer, of English, German, Portuguese-Eurasian and Chinese descent
 Benjamin Sheares (1907-1981), professor of obstetrics and gynaecology and former President of Singapore who held the position for 10 years from January 1971 
 Rex Shelley, author
 Christopher de Souza, lawyer and MP in the Holland Bukit Timah GRC, Parliament of Singapore
 Caroline Jane Smith, radio presenter
 Sarah Tan, model and Channel V International VJ
 Lloyd Valberg, firefighter, athlete and Singapore's sole competitor (high jump) at the 1948 London Olympics, Singapore's first official Olympian

See also
Eurasian (mixed ancestry)
Eurasian cuisine of Singapore and Malaysia
Indo (Eurasian)
Macanese people
Kristang language
Indian diaspora

References

Further reading

General works

Academic
 Hewett, Rosalind (2015) 'Children of Decolonisation: Postcolonial Indo (Eurasian) communities in Indonesia and the Netherlands', Indonesia and the Malay World, 43 (126): 191-206.
 Lowe, John; Mac an Ghaill, Mairtin (2015), 'The postcolonial ambiguities of Eurasian pan-ethnicity in Singapore', Asian and Pacific Migration Journal, 24 (2): 232-45.
 Pereira, Alexius (1997) ‘The Revitalization of Eurasian Identity in Singapore’, Asian Journal of Social Science, 25 (2): 7-24.
 Pereira, Alexius (2006) ‘No Longer “Other”: The Emergence of the Eurasian Community in Singapore’. In: Lian KF (ed) Race, Ethnicity and the State in Malaysia and Singapore. Leiden: Brill, 5-32.
 Rappa Antonio (2000) ‘Surviving the Politics of Late-modernity: the Eurasian Fringe Community of Singapore’, Asian Journal of Social Science, 28 (2): 153-80.
 Rocha, Zarine (2011) ‘Multiplicity within Singularity: Racial Categorization and Recognizing “Mixed Race” in Singapore’, Journal of Current Southeast Asian Affairs, 30 (3): 95-131.
 Rocha, Zarine (2014) ‘Stretching out the categories’: Chinese/European narratives of mixedness, belonging and home in Singapore, Ethnicities, 14 (2) 279-302.

Family histories

Fiction

Ethnic groups in Singapore
European diaspora in Singapore
 
Multiracial affairs in Asia